Pleasures U Like is the third studio album by Jon B. It's his first album under Tracey Edmonds' new label Edmonds Record Group. Edmonds formed the new label after Jon's previous label home Yab Yum Records folded. On Pleasures U Like, Jon reunites with past producers Babyface and Tim Kelley and Bob Robinson, who each produce one song. Also present on the album is the team of Joshua P. Thompson, a songwriter and producer and singer/songwriter/producer Quincy Patrick who is best known for their work with the R&B singer Joe.

Despite the album being certified gold, Jon felt it was not marketed and promoted properly. The only song released from the album as a single was "Don't Talk"- which was due primarily to Jon wanting to get out of his contract with Epic Records. As a result, this would be his final album released on a major label. Ten years after the release of Pleasures U Like, a song from the album "Calling on You" would later be known as the sample on Drake's song "Cameras" from his second album Take Care.
The album bowed at number 6 on the Billboard 200 and No.3 on the Top R&B/Hip-Hop Albums chart selling 99,000 in its debut week, becoming the first top 10 for Jon B.

Track listing
From Allmusic.

"Interlude" (Jonathan Buck) 1:11
"Finer Things" (featuring Nas) (Jonathan Buck, Nasir Jones) 5:01
"Vibezelect Café (Interlude)" (Jonathan Buck) 0:20
"Don't Talk" (Jonathan Buck) 4:44
"Sof'n Sweet" (Jonathan Buck, Tommy Brown) 5:03
"Overjoyed (featuring Faith Evans) (Jonathan Buck, Denaine Jones) 5:36
"Boy is Not a Man" (Joshua P. Thompson, Quincy Patrick, Jonathan Buck) 4:21
"Lonely Girl" (Kenneth Edmonds, Jonathan Buck) 4:28
"Cocoa Brown" (Jonathan Buck) 3:57
"What Up Boogotti? (Interlude)" (Jonathan Buck) 0:14
"All I Want is You" (featuring Cuban Link) (Jonathan Buck, Felix Delgado) 5:12
"Been Played (Interlude)" (Jonathan Buck) 0:53
"Layaway" (featuring AZ) (Jonathan Buck, Anthony Cruz) 4:49
"Pleasures U Like"  (Jonathan Buck, Phillip White, Shawn Rivera, Darryl Anthony Hawes, LeDon Bishop, Ngai McGee) 3:49
"Now That I'm With You" (Tim Kelley, Bob Robinson, Jonathan Buck) 4:17
"My Seed With You (Interlude)" (Jonathan Buck) 0:24
"Tell Me" (Jonathan Buck) 4:56
"Calling on You" (Jonathan Buck, Ngai McGee) 4:40
"Inside" (Jonathan Buck, David Kopp) 4:57
"Do it All Again" (Jonathan Buck, David Kopp) 4:55

Personnel
 
 Drum programming: Jon B., Tommy Brown, Babyface, Tim Kelley, David Kopp
 Keyboards: Jon B., Tommy Brown, Babyface, Tim Kelley, David Kopp
 Fender Rhodes: Bob Robinson
 Acoustic piano: Bob Robinson
 Bass: Kevin Buck, Nathan East
 Guitar: Joshua P. Thompson, Eric Jackson, Bob Robinson, Tim Kobza
 Cello: Kevin Buck
 Horn conduction and arrangement: Bill Meyers
 Background vocals: Jon B., Faith Evans, Babyface, Kenisha L. Greene, LeDon Bishop, Shawn Rivera, Phillip "Silky" White
 Recording: Jerome Goodall, Conley Abrams, Jon B., Earl Cohen, Paul Boutin, Jeffrey Thomas, Tim Kelley, Dave Pensado
 Mixing: Michael Patterson, Dave Pensado, Dave Guererro, Earl Cohen, Jon Gass, Jon B., Manny Marroquin, Conley Abrams, Josean Posey, Victor McCoy
 Mastering: Chris Gehringer
 Executive Producers: Jon B., Tracey Edmonds, Michael McQuarn, Jeff Burroughs
 Art direction and design: JayJay Jackson
 Photography: Norman Jean Roy

Charts

Weekly charts

Year-end charts

References

2001 albums
Albums produced by Tim & Bob
Epic Records albums
Jon B. albums